USS Ulysses (ARB-9) was planned as a United States Navy , but was redesignated as one of twelve Aristaeus-class battle damage repair ships built for the United States Navy during World War II. Named for Ulysses (a character in Greek mythology and the protagonist of Homer's epic poem, the Odyssey, which tells of his arduous voyage back to Ithaca, his home, after the Trojan War), she was the second US Naval vessel to bear the name.

Construction
Originally slated for construction as LST-967, but redesignated ARB-9 on 14 April 1944, and named Ulysses on 28 April 1944, the ship was laid down on 2 November 1944, at Hingham, Massachusetts, by the Bethlehem-Hingham Shipyard; launched on 2 December 1944; and commissioned on 27 December 1944, for transit to her conversion yard. After proceeding to Baltimore, she was decommissioned on 9 January 1945; converted to a battle damage repair ship by the Maryland Drydock Company; and recommissioned on 20 April 1945.

Service history
She steamed via the Panama Canal and San Pedro, and arrived at San Francisco, on the morning of 1 June. There, she loaded stores and pontoons before getting underway from San Francisco Bay on 28 June.

After Ulysses had been at sea for only six hours, the bolts, plates, and turnbuckles holding the pontoons in place began to show signs of bending under the stress of the ocean voyage, and the ship was ordered back to San Francisco, for additional work on the pontoon mounts. At noon on 6 July, she again got underway and set her course, via Pearl Harbor and Eniwetok, for the Marianas. She arrived at Saipan, on 6 August, (just over a week before Japan capitulated) and reported to Commander, Service Division 103.

The sailors aboard Ulysses knew nothing of this at the time, nor for several days afterwards.
 
During the remainder of 1945, she carried out repair assignments while based in turn at Saipan and at Okinawa. The repair ship lost three anchors in attempting to hold her position in the anchorage during the height of the storm and emerged from the ordeal with a  hole in one side.

In January 1946, Ulysses shifted operations to Shanghai; then, in March, she set her course for the United States. After transiting the Panama Canal and unloading ammunition at Charleston, South Carolina, in mid-May, she proceeded to Jacksonville, for preservation work. On 3 September, she reported to the 16th Fleet and, on 28 February 1947, she was decommissioned and joined the Atlantic Reserve Fleet at Green Cove Springs, Florida. She remained there until 1 January 1961, when her name was struck from the Naval Vessel Register.

West German service
Ulysses was transferred to the West Germany Navy and renamed Odin (A512). 
Commissioned in the German Navy 2 July 1960, at Kiel she was stationed at Naval Base Olpenitz for many years.

Notes

Citations

Bibliography 

Online resources

External links
 

 

Aristaeus-class repair ships
Aristaeus-class repair ships converted from LST-542-class ships
Ships built in Hingham, Massachusetts
1944 ships
World War II auxiliary ships of the United States
Aristaeus-class repair ships of the German Navy
Cold War auxiliary ships of Germany